Nathaniel P. Wilkerson (born 1972) is a Canadian artist from the Gitksan First Nation in northwestern British Columbia, Canada. He is a member of the House of Amagyet, a Laxgibuu (Wolf clan) house.

His work is reminiscent of the more traditional Haida/Gitksan style of artwork with heavy form lines and highly curvilinear elements.  Most of his work follows the conventional, traditional style of the artwork, although it consistently offers a new perspective of common native themes.

As of 2011, he is working with serigraph, copper, leather and wood (alder, red and yellow cedar).

External links
 Wilkerson Art
 The Schworak Site
 Native Online
 Gitxsan Chiefs' Office
 Washington State History Museum
 Black Tusk Gallery
 Alcheringa Gallery
 Medeek Native Art
 Medeek Design

1972 births
Living people
20th-century First Nations painters
20th-century First Nations sculptors
Canadian male sculptors
20th-century Canadian male artists
21st-century First Nations people
First Nations painters
First Nations printmakers
First Nations woodcarvers
Gitxsan people